Badminton was contested at the 2002 Asian Games at the Gangseo Gymnasium in Busan, South Korea from 6 October to 14 October 2002

. Singles, doubles, and team events were contested for both men and women.  Mixed Doubles were also contested.

Schedule

Medalists

Medal table

Participating nations
A total of 120 athletes from 16 nations competed in badminton at the 2002 Asian Games:

References
 2002 Asian Games website
2002 Asian Games Official Report, Pages 262–272

External links
Badminton Asia

 
2002 Asian Games events
2002
Asian Games
2002 Asian Games